Rik de Voest and Izak van der Merwe were the defending champions but de Voest decided not to participate.
van der Merwe played alongside Michael Yani, losing in the semifinals.
Carsten Ball and Bobby Reynolds won the title, defeating Travis Parrott and Simon Stadler 7–6(9–7), 6–4 in the final.

Seeds

Draw

Draw

References
 Main Draw

Savannah Challenger - Doubles
2012 Doubles